Kristen may refer to:

Kristen (given name), includes a list of people with the name
ITC Kristen, a typeface created by George Ryan for the International Typeface Corporation (ITC)
"Kristen", the alias used by Ashley Alexandra Dupré, a central figure in the Eliot Spitzer prostitution scandal